The Holiday Sessions is an EP by American rock band Paramore. The 7" vinyl is limited edition, with only 700 copies made, 300 of which released during the Record Store Day 2013 in Nashville, Tennessee, on April 20.

The 7" vinyl has the shape of a pink hibiscus flower.

The EP consists of the three interludes from the band's fourth self-titled studio album, Paramore.

Track listing

Personnel
Hayley Williams – lead vocals
Jeremy Davis – bass guitar
Taylor York – ukulele

References

External links
The Paramore Webstore

2013 EPs
Paramore EPs
Fueled by Ramen EPs
Record Store Day releases